Albinaria janicollis is a species of air-breathing land snail, a terrestrial pulmonate gastropod mollusk in the family Clausiliidae, the door snails.

Distribution
This species occurs in Greece.  It is endemic to Crete, where it occurs only on the Gianysada Island within the Islands of Dionysades.

Description
This clausilid species is characterized by a small, prominently ribbed shell. It is not bulbously shaped but with a straight outline. At the penultimate whorl it is detached and protruding with a small aperture.

References

External links
http://www.animalbase.uni-goettingen.de/zooweb/servlet/AnimalBase/home/species?id=1008

Gastropods described in 1991
Albinaria
Endemic fauna of Crete
Molluscs of Europe